King Khawuta kaGcaleka (Born:1761-Died:1804) was the king of the AmaXhosa Nation from 1792 To 1804. He is a direct descendant of King Phalo's Great House.

King Khawuta KaGcaleka was the eldest son of King Gcaleka kaPhalo.King Khawuta KaGcaleka had three sons, Prince Bhurhu kaKhawuta (1785), King Hintsa ka Khawuta (1789) and Prince Malashe ka Khawuta.

King Khawuta KaGcaleka died in 1804 near what is now Kentani in the Eastern Cape Province. Other sources record 1794 or 1820 as the year of death.

1761 births
1804 deaths
18th-century rulers in Africa
Rulers of the Gcaleka
Xhosa people